Elongation protein 4 homolog (S. cerevisiae), also known as ELP4, is a protein which in humans is encoded by the ELP4 gene.

Function
This gene encodes a component of the six subunit elongator complex, a histone acetyltransferase complex that associates directly with RNA polymerase II during transcriptional elongation. The human gene can partially complement sensitivity phenotypes of yeast ELP4 deletion mutants. Alternatively spliced variants that encode different protein isoforms have been described but the full-length nature of only one has been determined.

Clinical significance
In a study published in February 2009, researcher linked this gene to the most common form of human epilepsy, namely Rolandic epilepsy. This is the first gene to be linked with rolandic epilepsy.

Background
It has been found that children with Rolandic epilepsy have a mutation of gene coding for the Elongator Protein Complex 4, which is involved in transcription and tRNA modification. Furthermore, Elp4 is needed for histone acetyltransferase (HAT) activity which makes DNA more accessible for transcription.  The lack of the Elp4/5/6 led to no HAT activity.  The importance of HAT activity is the initiation of transcription as well as its assistance of RNA polymerase II in transcription elongation through chromatin and acetyl-CoA dependent pathways.  Although Rolandic epilepsy (RE), which has been observed as autosomal dominant with high penetrance, develops around age 3 and disappears by age 12 there are serious problems that need to be addressed that occur while a child has RE. One of the major problems that can arise from RE is cognitive impairment. Though the cognitive impairment seen in Rolandic Epilepsy is of unclear etiology, one contributing factor may be increased glucose uptake in cortical areas, most notably in the associative cortex. These changes in glucose uptake may somehow disrupt the learning process and prevents the child from making the associations necessary to learn new things, which is how most human learning is achieved. Other factors which may contribute to cognitive impairment include seizure frequency, abnormal electrical activity in between seizures, and medication side effects, to only name a few.

The Elongator Protein Complex (ELP) is what regulates the growth of cortical projection neurons. This means that it helps cortical neurons to exhibit dendrite branching and radial migration of neurons to form the close knit neural network of the cerebral cortex. If ELP is not working properly or is not being expressed at the correct levels (too low) then the neurons in that region in particular would not be properly situated in relation to each other for proper brain activity. The expression of ELP and the fourth sub-unit (ELP4) in particular is the cause of Rolandic epilepsy and possibly other cognitive impairment later in life if the condition is severe enough or if it is not treated effectively.

References

Further reading